AITR may refer to:

 Activation-Inducible TNFR family Receptor, also known as TNFRSF18
 Acropolis Institute of Technology and Research
 The Academy of Information Technology and Robotics at Spruce Creek High School
 Annual Income Tax Return